Medical fetishism refers to a number of sexual fetishes in which participants derive sexual pleasure from medical scenarios including objects, practices, environments, and situations of a medical or clinical nature. In sexual roleplay, a hospital or medical scene involves the sex partners assuming the roles of doctors, nurses, surgeons and patients to act out specific or general medical fetishes. Medical fantasy is a genre in pornography, though the fantasy may not necessarily involve pornography or sexual activity.

Medical fetishism may involve sexual attraction to respiratory therapy involving oxygen supplied via nasal cannula or any sort of mask, medical practitioners, medical uniforms, hospital gowns, anesthesia, intimate examinations (such as rectal examination, gynecological examination, urological examination, andrological examination, rectal temperature-taking), catheterization, diapering, enemas, injections, insertion (such as suppository insertion, menstrual-cup insertion, and prostatic massage), auscultation, medical devices (such as orthopedic casts and orthopedic braces; see also "abasiophilia"), dental objects (such as dental braces, retainers, and headgear), medical restraints, and medical gags.

Anything that involves health, wellness, and the need for a doctor or nurse could potentially play into medical fetishism. Such a diversity makes medical fetishism a common form of BDSM, sexual roleplay, or extreme play for all levels.

Physical examination 

Some people eroticize intimate examinations as part of a medical fetish, and as such are a common service offered by professional dominants.

An intimate examination can form part of a scene in medical play where the nurse or doctor (or even or a nun) inflicts one or more embarrassing and humiliating quasi-medical procedures on the patient. Often, frozen or heated objects are introduced to the patient's body to simulate the uncomfortable sensations that can occur during a real examination. Examinations may include an examination and intrusion of the anus, urethra, or vagina, as well as handling and manipulation of the penis, testicles, clitoris, and nipples. Quite often, strap-on play is also incorporated, as this can heighten the intimacy and the sensations of the "patient" (recipient). This may be a prelude to masturbation or administration of an enema. Before examination, the patient can be placed in physical restraints and gagged, and wear some form of embarrassing clothing.

Temperature-taking fetishism 

Temperature-taking fetish is a sexual fetish for oral and rectal thermometers. This may include the sexual attraction to the equipment, processes, environments, or scenarios/situations. The fetish is characterized by sexual arousal from the desire to take another person's temperature or have one's temperature taken. Although there is also an interest in oral temperature taking, rectal temperature-taking is more prominent and often precedes enema play.

Enema fetishism 

Enema fetishism is a sexual fetish for enemas and is a type of klismaphilia, the general enjoyment of enemas, and hence those enjoying enemas are referred to as klismaphiliacs. This fetish includes not only giving and receiving enemas but also sexual attraction to the equipment, processes, environments, situations, or scenarios,. Some may be sexually aroused by the preparations, such as by the feel and smell of a latex rubber or plastic syringe, by the smell of soapsuds enema solution, or by preparing the recipient. Roleplaying often accompanies these activities.

Enemas can cause sexual arousal in both women and men because the bulbospongiosus muscle which starts in front of the anus contributes, in women, to clitoral erection and the contractions of orgasm, and closing the vagina. In men, this muscle correlates to erections, the contractions of orgasm, and ejaculation. Sexual sensation results from  distention of the rectum by filling and dilating it with the volume of an enema which in women, puts pressure on the back of the vagina, and in men stimulates the prostate and seminal vesicles. Also, contractions of muscles throughout the abdomen caused by expulsion of an enema can stimulate, in women, the uterus and vagina, and in men, the prostate, seminal vesicle, and internal penis.

Because enemas involve at least partial nudity and the exposure and probing of the anus, many people find them embarrassing. An erotic enema holds the possibility of acting out vulnerability in a primal form. Among the attractions to enema play are psychodrama, power exchange, erotic humiliation, discipline, and  so on. BDSM punishment scenes can use  extra-large volumes or highly irritating substances to produce pain and cramps. Klismaphiliacs often discover their fetish for enemas after having one administered.

Medical restraints 
Medical fetishism can also include the use of medical restraints, including straitjackets, historically associated with the treatment of mentally ill people.

Anesthesia fetishism 

Anesthesia fetishism is a sexual fetish for anesthesia. This may include the sexual attraction to the equipment, processes, substances, effects, environments or situations. Sexual arousal from the desire to administer anesthesia, or the sexual desire for oneself to be anesthetized are two forms in which an individual may exist as an arbiter of the fetish. Older-style anesthesia masks of black rubber, still in occasional use today, are one of the more common elements fetishized, and have earned the nickname Black Beauty by many fetishists.

Acts, behaviour and rituals 
Anesthesia fetish is considered edgeplay, as when realized outside the boundaries of fantasy may result in various degrees of harm, or death. Fantasies are elaborated by the viewing of images and reading of stories of anesthetic inductions. Edgeplay may involve obtaining and scening with various anesthesia-related paraphernalia—usually anesthesia masks for breathplay, the acquisition of anesthetics for anesthetizing others or being anesthetized oneself, and the occupation of a medical setting or environment for the same practice.

Some anesthesia fetishists who seek to be anesthetized may feign or induce medical conditions in an attempt to obtain general anesthesia from medical personnel. This is considered safer than playing with anesthetic agents outside of a medical setting.

Internet influence 
The Internet has enabled people with this relatively rare paraphilia to discuss the subject and exchange anesthesia-related multimedia.

See also 

 Amputation fetishism
 Klismaphilia
 List of fictional nurses
 Paraphilia
 Playing doctor

References

Bibliography
 Gary L. Albrecht, "Encyclopedia of disability, Volume 2", Sage Publications, 2006, p. 1437
 Midori, "Wild Side Sex: The Book of Kink Educational, Sensual, And Entertaining Essays", Daedalus Publishing, 2005, p. 211

Sexual fetishism
Paraphilias
Medicine and health in fiction
BDSM terminology